The French ironclad Montcalm was a wooden-hulled armored corvette built for the French Navy in the mid-1860s. She was named after Major General Montcalm who lost the Battle of the Plains of Abraham in 1759. She played a minor role in the Franco-Prussian War of 1870–1871 where she captured one Prussian sailing ship. Montcalm spent most of her later career abroad, either in Chinese waters or in the Pacific Ocean. The ship was condemned in 1891.

Design and description
The s were designed as improved versions of the armored corvette  suitable for foreign deployments. Unlike their predecessor the Alma-class ships were true central battery ironclads as they were fitted with armored transverse bulkheads. Like most ironclads of their era they were equipped with a metal-reinforced ram.

Her crew numbered 316 officers and men.

Propulsion
The ship had a single horizontal return connecting-rod steam engine driving a single propeller. Her engine was powered by four oval boilers. On sea trials, the engine produced  and the ship reached .

Armament
Montcalm mounted her four  Modèle 1864 breech-loading guns in the central battery on the battery deck. The other two 194-millimeter guns were mounted in barbettes on the upper deck, sponsoned out over the sides of the ship. The four  guns were also mounted on the upper deck. She may have exchanged her Mle 1864 guns for Mle 1870 guns. The guns could fire both solid shot and explosive shells.

Armor
The unarmored portions of her sides were protected by  iron plates.

Service
Montcalm was laid down at Rochefort on 26 October 1865 and launched on 16 October 1868. The ship began her sea trials on 16 June 1869 and was then sent to the Mediterranean until May 1870. During the Franco-Prussian War, she captured the German barque Union in the North Sea and watched the Prussian corvette  in Portuguese waters. She cruised the North and South Atlantic before being put in reserve on 1 August 1871 at Cherbourg. Recommissioned on 20 October 1873, she sailed for China on 5 January 1874 to relieve the armored corvette  as flagship of the China Station. Montcalm arrived back in Cherbourg on 20 May 1876 and was reduced to reserve from 1878 to 1880. In 1882, she became flagship for the Pacific division under command of Rear Admiral Landolfe. Back to Cherbourg in 1884, she remained there until 2 April 1891 when she was condemned.

Notes

Footnotes

References
 

 

Ships built in France
Alma-class ironclads
1868 ships